Patsy Serafina Akeli (née McKenzie) (born 7 December 1978 in Motootua) is a Samoan javelin thrower. She is a two-time Olympian, a 2008 national javelin throw champion, and a member of QEII Track Club in Australia. She set both a national record and a personal best throw of 54.78 metres, by winning her event at the New Zealand Athletics Championships in Wellington, New Zealand.

Akeli made her official debut for the 2004 Summer Olympics in Beijing, where she placed fortieth in the qualifying rounds of the women's javelin throw, at a distance of 45.93 metres.

At the 2006 Commonwealth Games in Melbourne, Australia, Akeli achieved her best career result, when she finished ninth in the final round of the women's javelin, with a best possible throw of 51.25 metres.

At the 2008 Summer Olympics in Beijing, Akeli qualified for the second time in the women's javelin throw. She performed the best throw of 49.26 metres, on her third and final attempt, finishing forty-ninth overall in the qualifying rounds.

Achievements

References

External links
 
NBC 2008 Olympics profile
Sports reference biography

Samoan female javelin throwers
Living people
Olympic athletes of Samoa
Athletes (track and field) at the 2004 Summer Olympics
Athletes (track and field) at the 2008 Summer Olympics
Athletes (track and field) at the 2006 Commonwealth Games
Commonwealth Games competitors for Samoa
1978 births
World Athletics Championships athletes for Samoa